Barbara Gerken (born July 3, 1964) is a former American international tennis player who was a quarterfinalist at the 1981 US Open.   She had a career record of 66–78. She had a career high singles ranking of World No. 55 in June 1987.

WTA Career finals

Singles: 3 (0–3)

References

External links 
 
 
 Barbara Gerken at australianopen.com

1964 births
Living people
American female tennis players
21st-century American women